Detroit Lakes Airport  is a city-owned public-use airport located two miles (3 km) west of the central business district of Detroit Lakes, a city in Becker County, Minnesota, United States.

Facilities and aircraft 

For the 12-month period ending July 29, 2010, the airport had 16,200 aircraft operations, an average of 44 per day: 84% general aviation and 16% air taxi.

In March 2017, there were 58 aircraft based at this airport: 48 single-engine, 5 multi-engine, 2 jet and 3 ultralight.

Cargo

References

External links 
 

Airports in Minnesota
Buildings and structures in Becker County, Minnesota
Transportation in Becker County, Minnesota